The following is a list of the Colombia national football team's competitive records and statistics.

Individual records

Player records 

Players in bold are still active with Colombia.

Most capped players

Most capped goalkeepers

Top goalscorers

Manager records

Team records

Competition records

FIFA World Cup

1.Played Intercontinental playoffs.

Copa América

 Champions   Runners-up   Third place   Fourth place

FIFA Confederations Cup

Head-to-head record
This is a list of the official games played by Colombia national football team up to and including the match against Argentina on 1 February 2022.

AFC

CAF

CONCACAF

CONMEBOL

OFC

UEFA

Full Confederation record

References

Colombia national football team records and statistics
National association football team records and statistics